The 2012 New Mexico State Aggies football team represented New Mexico State University in the 2012 NCAA Division I FBS football season. The Aggies were led by fourth–year head coach DeWayne Walker who resigned after the end of the season and played their home games at Aggie Memorial Stadium. They were members of the Western Athletic Conference. This was their final season as a member of the WAC. With the WAC ceasing to support football in the 2013 season, New Mexico State became an FBS Independent for the 2013 season. They finished the season 1–11, 0–6 in WAC play to finish in last place.

Schedule

Game summaries

Sacramento State

@ Ohio

@ UTEP

New Mexico

UTSA

@ Idaho

@ Utah State

Louisiana Tech

@ Auburn

San Jose State

BYU

@ Texas State

This was the final WAC football game in history.

References

New Mexico State
New Mexico State Aggies football seasons
New Mexico State Aggies football